Dennis van Winden (born 2 December 1987) is a Dutch professional road bicycle racer, who last rode for UCI Professional Continental team .

Career

Amateur career

Professional career
In November 2012 he underwent surgery to correct a kink that had developed in an internal iliac artery in his right leg, however he contracted an infection from the surgery which resulted in months of further treatment, leaving him unable to return to competition until May 2013.

In November 2014 van Winden announced that he would join  for the 2015 season, with a focus on riding as part of the team's sprint train.

Major results

2006
 1st Omloop van de Alblasserwaard
2007
 2nd Overall Giro delle Regioni
2008
 1st  Overall Tour du Haut-Anjou
1st Stage 1
 1st Stage 2 Giro delle Regioni
 2nd Vlaamse Pijl
2009
 1st  Time trial, National Under–23 Road Championships
 1st Prologue Istrian Spring Trophy
 1st Stage 1 Tour de Bretagne Cycliste
 1st Stage 2 Vuelta Ciclista a León
 1st Stage 9 Tour de l'Avenir
 1st Stage 1 (TTT) Olympia's Tour
 3rd U23 Liège–Bastogne–Liège
2011
 9th Ster ZLM Toer
2012
 5th Binche–Chimay–Binche
 9th Ronde van Zeeland Seaports
2017
 7th Overall Tour de Azerbaijan
 9th Schaal Sels
2018
 9th Overall Czech Cycling Tour
 10th Overall Arctic Race of Norway

References

External links

 
 

1987 births
Living people
Dutch male cyclists
Sportspeople from Delft
UCI Road World Championships cyclists for the Netherlands
European Games competitors for the Netherlands
Cyclists at the 2019 European Games
Cyclists from South Holland#
20th-century Dutch people
21st-century Dutch people